Silesian Foothills are foothills located in Silesian Voivodeship, Poland.

It has an area of 545 km2. Its western border is Olza river, eastern Skawa. Other main rivers that cut the foothills are from west to east: Vistula, Biała and Soła. To the south are Silesian Beskids and Little Beskids, in north it converts into Ostrava Basin and Oświęcim Basin. The towns located on the foothills are: Cieszyn, Skoczów, Bielsko-Biała, Kęty, Andrychów and Wadowice.

See also
 Silesian Highlands
 Silesian Lowlands
 Silesian-Lusatian Lowlands
 Silesian-Moravian Foothills

References 

Landforms of Silesian Voivodeship
Cieszyn Silesia